is a Japanese tokusatsu series that aired from October 7, 1974, to March 31, 1975. It was a sequel to Super Robot Red Baron.

In Taiwan, the series was adapted into an 86-minute feature film called "The Iron Superman" which used footage from the original series as well as new footage of Hong Kong actors replacing the original Japanese cast not unlike Mighty Morphin' Power Rangers . That movie was also released in Spain (under the title "Mazinger Z - El robot de las estrellas", even though it bore no relation to Mazinger Z) and Germany ("Roboter der Sterne").

Episodes

 Sortie to Mach Baron Akatsuki
 Fang of the Sky Trap of the Sea
 Mach Baron Robbery Plan
 Kiss Submarine Base Bombing Order
 Bet on that Moment!
 Tokyo Bombing 5 Hours
 10 Seconds of Decision!
 Horrible Suicide Squad
 Glass Super Robot 
 Illusion of Giant Baron
 Betrayal Senjogahara
 Invincible Chogokin Robot
 The Terrifying UFO Identity
 Mach Colleder Dedicated to a Friend
 Shiver! Sniper Q
 Finger Man Sea
 Desperate Despair! Matchbox Strategy
 The Great Invention of Invention Criminals
 Angel from Hell
 Operation Troy 1 to 1
 Take the Route South-Southwest
 Chase! Phoenix Mystery
 Lullar Angry Hell Operation
 Hydrogen Bomb Limited 900KM
 Trump is Pile X
 Mach Baron's Super Secret

References
Super Robot Mach Baron at Japan Hero

External links 
 

1974 Japanese television series debuts
1975 Japanese television series endings
Nippon TV original programming
Tokusatsu television series